Meniocus is a genus of flowering plants belonging to the family Brassicaceae.

Its native range is Western Mediterranean, Southeastern and Eastern Europe to Mongolia and Arabian Peninsula.

Species
Species:

Meniocus aureus 
Meniocus hirsutus 
Meniocus linifolius 
Meniocus stylaris

References

Brassicaceae
Brassicaceae genera